Paula Cristina de Araújo Gonçalves (born 11 August 1990) is an inactive Brazilian tennis player.

She has won one doubles title on the WTA Tour, as well as seven singles and 24 doubles titles on the ITF Women's Circuit. On 15 August 2016, Gonçalves achieved her career-high singles ranking of world No. 158. On 29 February 2016, she peaked at No. 95 in the doubles rankings.

Career

2015
Gonçalves and Beatriz Haddad Maia won the title on Copa Colsanitas defeating Irina Falconi and Shelby Rogers in the final. This was her first WTA Tour title.

Partnering Sanaz Marand, Gonçalves won her first $75k tournament in September at the Albuquerque defeating Tamira Paszek and Anna Tatishvili in the final.

2016
Paula made her first WTA singles quarterfinal at the Rio Open after straight-sets wins over Shahar Pe'er, Alizé Lim, Julia Glushko, Johanna Larsson. Her run was ended by Shelby Rogers.

She made her first WTA singles semifinal two months later at the Copa Colsanitas after wins over Verónica Cepede Royg, Tatjana Maria and Alexandra Panova.

WTA career finals

Doubles: 1 (title)

ITF Circuit finals

Singles: 14 (7 titles, 7 runner–ups)

Doubles: 44 (24 titles, 20 runner–ups)

References

External links
 
 
 

1990 births
Living people
Tennis players from São Paulo
Brazilian female tennis players
Tennis players at the 2015 Pan American Games
Tennis players at the 2016 Summer Olympics
Olympic tennis players of Brazil
South American Games gold medalists for Brazil
South American Games bronze medalists for Brazil
South American Games medalists in tennis
Competitors at the 2014 South American Games
Pan American Games competitors for Brazil
21st-century Brazilian women